Lake Mantasoa is a large lake with a surface area of , created by the Mantasoa Dam on the Varahina river (an affluent of the Ikopa river) in the municipality of Mantasoa, Analamanga region of Madagascar. It provides tabbed water for the capitol Antananarivo.

Geography
It is situated at 68km east of Antananarivo.

References

Mantasoa
Analamanga